William Plumer may refer to:

William Plumer (died 1767) (c. 1686-1767), British Member of Parliament for Hertfordshire and Yarmouth (Isle of Wight)
William Plumer (1736–1822), British Member of Parliament for Hertfordshire, Lewes and Higham Ferrers 
William Plumer (1759–1850), U.S. politician from New Hampshire
William Plumer Jr. (1789-1854) was a U.S. Representative from New Hampshire, son of William Plumer
William Swan Plumer (1802-1880), American clergyman

See also
Bill Plummer, baseball player
William Plummer (disambiguation)